A High Wind in Jamaica may refer to:

 A High Wind in Jamaica (novel), a 1929 novel
 A High Wind in Jamaica (film), a 1965 film based on the novel